Castro Laboreiro e Lamas de Mouro is a civil parish in the municipality of Melgaço, Portugal. It was formed in 2013 by the merger of the former parishes Castro Laboreiro and Lamas de Mouro. The population in 2011 was 657, in an area of 106.09 km2.

Castro Laboreiro is 1 of 18 parishes of the Melgaço municipality.

Climate

References

Freguesias of Melgaço, Portugal